Roslyn High School is a public high school in Roslyn Heights, New York, United States, and is the only high school in the Roslyn Union Free School District, serving all of the district's students in grades 912.

History

The property that Roslyn High School sits on was donated in the 1920s by Clarence and Katherine Mackay, both famous figures in Roslyn's history. They owned a large estate in the area, known as "Harbor Hill" (of which the donated land was once part), and a plaque was created to commemorate the land donation. It was originally located in the lobby of the original school building, and is now located on the wall near the replacement building's visitor entrance.

Additionally, Katherine Mackay was the first woman to serve on Roslyn's school board.

Original building (1920s1970s) 

The original school building opened in 1925, designed by architect William Bunker Tubby in the Colonial Revival Style. It consisted of a columned main entrance, adorned on both sides by symmetrical wings. The main entrance was reached by a staircase leading from the intersection of Lincoln Avenue and Roslyn Road. An extension was built off the back of the school in the 1950s during the postwar Baby boom, which stands to this day.

The architect and the district commissioned the Olmsted Brothers to design the landscaping of the school's grounds.

Current building (1970spresent) 

Between 1970 and 1971, the original, Tubby-designed 1920s school building was demolished and replaced by the current structure. However, there are numerous remnants of the old building that remain - most notably the middle segment of the stairway underneath the school (which made up the middle section of the original steps up to the original building's main entrance) and the main gymnasium (which was built with the original school for the same purpose). Lecture Room B was the original school's auditorium, and the room behind it was the original stage. The school maintains a collection of historic photographs in "The Commons", including many of the old school.

2004 Financial scandal
In February 2004, Rebekah Rombom, as editor-in-chief of The Hilltop Beacon, the Roslyn High School newspaper, was preparing the March issue when she was given information that a woman had stolen money from the school district two years earlier, but was allowed to resign quietly without criminal charges.

As Rombom researched the story for her newspaper, she discovered that the woman, who had embezzled at least $250,000, was Pamela Gluckin, the school district's former assistant superintendent for business, but she was told she could not use Gluckin's name in her article. She was also told that she needed to show the article to her principal and the director of community relations before publication; both read it and did not request any changes. The publication of the article in the school's newspaper triggered a full-scale investigation that found officials had embezzled $11.2 million from the district over 8 years. Gluckin and Frank Tassone, the superintendent of the school district at the time, eventually pleaded guilty and went to prison.

Former Roslyn student Mike Makowsky dramatized the scandal in the 2019 HBO film Bad Education, starring Hugh Jackman as Tassone and Allison Janney as Gluckin. The film won a Primetime Emmy Award for Outstanding Television Movie.

2010s

Interactive learning
In 2013, iPads replaced many textbooks, in part as a budgetary move. In 2019, Chromebooks replaced iPads as the school-issued device.

All classrooms are equipped with interactive whiteboards, which are linked with the given classroom's computer.

Renovations
In the summer of 2017, the district embarked on a major renovation project at the high school, as part of a district-wide modernization initiative. This renovation included completely gutting and renovating the first floor hallways, demolishing, replacing, and expanding the library, constructing an additional gymnasium, installing air conditioning in the world language and math/2nd floor science hallways, reconfiguring the front circle and constructing an entrance plaza (including an awning and vegetation) and security vestibule, expanding and resurfacing the faculty and student parking lots by relocating the district's bus garage to an area adjacent to one of the elementary schools, and creating a student lounge next to the school store. Further renovations were completed during the summer of 2018. Additionally, the center of the front circle would remain the home for one of the marble horse tamer statues from the Mackay estate, which was restored and re-dedicated on October 10, 2019.

Mackay Horse Tamer statue

As part of the Mackay estate, numerous statues were commissioned - including multiple marble horse tamer statues. After the Mackay estate was demolished, the statue that now resides at the high school was forgotten, only to be stumbled upon years later by a local artist, George Gách. In 1959, the district, at Gách's request, took possession of the horse tamer statue to ensure that it be preserved and maintained. The statue was restored and installed at the high school. For many years after the district took ownership, Gách continued to look after and maintain the statue.

In  2012 the statue was temporarily removed from the school for an extensive rehabilitation, as it had been damaged by weathering and vandals. In 2017 the school underwent an extensive modernization, and the front circle was reconfigured. A garden was created in the grassy island of the front circle, with trees, bushes and flowers, and the school’s flagpole. The restored statue was made the garden’s centerpiece, complete with a new pedestal. The re-dedication ceremony for the Horse Tamer took place in the front circle on October 10, 2019, and was a major community event.

Demographics
As of the 20172018 school year, Roslyn High School had a total enrollment of 1,038 students, and had 87.04 full-time equivalent classroom teachers. The student/teacher ratio was 11.93-to-1.

Below are various charts that further describe the demographics of the student body as of the 201718 school year, using the same public data from the National Center for Education Statistics (NCES):

Notable alumni
Arthur Agatston – developer of the South Beach Diet
Deborah Asnis – infectious disease specialist, discovered the first human cases of West Nile virus in the United States
Michael Crichton – author, film director (The Andromeda Strain, Westworld, Congo, Jurassic Park, etc.)
Daniel Dorff – classical composer
Cheryl Machat Dorskind – fine-art photographer
Howard Gordon – producer and screenwriter (Fox television series, 24)
Richard Haass – President of the Council on Foreign Relations
Ken Hechler – fiercely-liberal West Virginia congressman, assistant to Harry Truman
Paul Housberg – artist
Jesse Itzler – musician, co-founder of Marquis Jet
Henry Jackson – financier and founder of OpCapita
Bobby Kotick – CEO, president, and a director of Activision Blizzard
Edward S. Lampert – former chairman and CEO of Sears Holdings Corporation
Ken Langone – founder of The Home Depot, RHS class of 1953
Michael Graubart Levin – New York Times best selling author and CEO, BusinessGhost
Wendy Liebman – stand-up comedian
Chris Miller – screenwriter and National Lampoon contributor
Frank C. Moore – artist
Andrew M. Murstein – founder, board member, president, and largest shareholder of Medallion Financial
David Nasaw – historian and author
Peter Pitegoff – Dean, University of Buffalo Law School and University of Maine Law School (2005-2015)
Mike Pollock (1983) – voice actor
Darren Rovell – ESPN sports business reporter
Jen Selter – fitness model
Gregory B. Starr – UN security chief
Judith Steinberg, M.D. – physician and wife of Howard Dean, the former Governor of Vermont (1991-2003) and DNC chair (2005-2009)
Gary Winnick – philanthropist, financier, and founder of Global Crossing
Jeff Wilpon – former COO of the New York Mets

References

External links
 

Educational institutions established in 1904
Public high schools in New York (state)
Town of North Hempstead, New York
Schools in Nassau County, New York
1904 establishments in New York (state)